Senthoora Poove is an Indian Tamil language drama airing on Star Vijay. It premiered 27 July 2020 and ended on 13 April 2022 The series stars Ranjith and Sreenithi Menon. It has completed over 300 episodes.

Plot

Duraisingam, a rich widower, has 2 daughters namely Kani and Kayal. He lives with his family. His wife Aruna, dies during the birth of their second child Kayal. Durai refuses to remarry though forced by his mother and sister, Bhaagampriyaal. Meanwhile, Durai's maternal uncle plans to get his daughter Aishwarya to marry Durai so that they can have all of Durai's wealth. But Durai denies it, pointing out the age difference between them, and promises to find her a better match. Aishwarya is disappointed because of this. Roja, a young girl, joins the school as Kayal's class teacher. Kayal believes her to be her mother because of the similar appearances of Roja to her mother Aruna as seen in photos and gets close to her. Roja elopes with her love, Anbu, and gets married. But Roja's uncle Pandian kills Anbu by setting up an accident and gets Roja to come home and creates drama to get her married to Durai. But she refuses. Durai, later on, agrees to marry Roja as per his mother and sister's request. Roja tells Durai that she is carrying Anbu's child. But on that day, Durai was not feeling well, so he doesn't hear parts of her confession. He only hears the words that Roja is ready to marry him. So their engagement and marriage are arranged. Aishwarya and her family try to kidnap and kill Roja and send Durai a voice message saying Roja is not interested in the marriage in Roja's voice. Roja's friend Sandhya (Alya Manasa) feels suspicious of this and calls Durai. Durai saves Roja and brings her to the engagement hall, where their engagement happens peacefully. On the day of the wedding, Aishwarya dresses up like Roja and wears a face mask as per the rituals. But Durai notices that Aishwarya was dressing up as Roja. Durai gets very furious with Aishwarya. Now after marriage, Durai gets shocked when he gets to know about Roja and Anbu's baby. He gets furious and starts to hate Roja. But after learning the truth, he apologies to Roja and accepts her and the child.

Cast 
 Ranjith as Duraisingam "Durai": Aruna's husband; Roja's 2nd husband; Kayal and Kanimozhi's father
Srineethi Menon as Roja Duraisingam: Anbu's former wife; Durai's 2nd wife; Kayal and Kanimozhi's stepmother

Recurring 
 Dharsha Gupta / Santhiya Ram / Sushma Nair as Aishwarya: Rajendran's Daughter; Duraisingam's cousin sister (Main Antagonist)
 Riya Manoj / Divyadharshini as Kayalvizhi Duraisingam "Kayal": Duraisingam and Aruna's younger daughter 
 Nivashni Shyaam as Kanimozhi Duraisingam "Kani": Duraisingam and Aruna's elder daughter 
Priya Raman as Aruna Duraisingam : Duraisingam's wife, Kani and Kayal's Mother (Died and appears as Ghost)
 Shanthi Williams as Rajalakshmi, Duraisingam's mother
 Shree Durga Gautam / Yamuna Chinnadurai as Bhaagampriyaal, "Priyaal": Duraisingam's younger sister
 Feroz Khan as Mayazhagu: Rajendran's son (Antagonist) (Dead)
 "Murattu Pandian" Babloo as Rajendran: Duraisingam's maternal uncle; Rajalakshmi's younger brother (Antagonist)
 Mercy Leyal as Jeyanti: Duraisingam's maternal aunt; Rajendran Wife (Antagonist)
 Pondy Ravi as Pandian: Roja's maternal uncle (Antagonist)
 Preethi Shree / Jeyashree Nair vas Shanthi: Roja's maternal aunt (Antagonist)
 Sumathi Sree as Muthulakshmi: Roja's mother
 Deepa Shankar as Mariamma: Anbu’s mother (Antagonist)

Special appearances
 Dhiraviam Rajakumaran as Anbu: Roja's ex-lover and first husband (died in serial)
 Alya Manasa as Sandhya, Roja's friend 
 K. Bhagyaraj as himself
 Vinoth as himself
 Sindhu (Vinoth's wife)
 Kumaran as himself
 Suhasini (Kumaran's wife)

Production
The series premiered on 8 June 2020. Actor Ranjith, the lead of the series, makes his television debut with the series.

References 

Star Vijay original programming
2020s Tamil-language television series
Tamil-language romance television series
2020 Tamil-language television series debuts
Tamil-language television shows
2022 Tamil-language television series endings